Cosmisoma speculiferum is a species of beetle in the family Cerambycidae. It was described by Gory in 1831.

References

Cosmisoma
Beetles described in 1831